was a Japanese Orientalist, and the son of a Shinto priest who descended from a long line of Shinto priests. During the Holocaust he helped Jewish refugees to escape the Nazis, arranging for them to stay first in Kobe and later in Japanese-occupied Shanghai. He also fought against Nazi-inspired anti-Jewish propaganda. A book about how he helped Jewish refugees was written by Japanese actor Jundai Yamada and published in April 2013 by NHK Shuppan.

He converted to Judaism in 1959 after converting to Christianity from Shinto in his youth. In his book "From Tokyo to Jerusalem" he explained that he never was satisfied from his conversion to Christianity.

He first encountered Jews while working for the South Manchuria Railroad Company during World War II.

See also 

 Chiune Sugihara, Japanese diplomat who saved thousands of Jews during the Holocaust

References

1899 births
1973 deaths
Japanese Jews
Japanese Hebraists
Japanese orientalists
Japanese former Christians
Converts to Christianity from pagan religions
Converts to Judaism from Christianity
Jews and Judaism in Japan
Jewish Japanese history
Japanese anti-fascists
Jewish anti-fascists
People from Kyoto
People who rescued Jews during the Holocaust